Rapid Omnisports de Menton is a French association football club founded in 1916. They are based in the town of Menton and their home stadium is the Stade Lucien Rhein. As of the 2020–21 season, they play in the Mediterranean League of the French Régional 1, the sixth division of the French football League system.

The club was formed on February 10, 1916 as Olympique de Menton et du Cap Martin. In 1934, the club changed its name to Football Club de Menton and in 1937 became Rapid Football Club. They merged with Sport Ouvrier Club of Menton in 1946 to form Rapid Omni Sports of Menton.

Former players
 Players that have played/managed in the football league or any foreign equivalent to this level (i.e. fully professional league).
 Players with full international caps.
Cédric Varrault
Frédéric Advice-Desruisseaux

References

External links
Rapid de Menton official website 

Menton
Menton
1916 establishments in France
Sport in Alpes-Maritimes
Football clubs in Provence-Alpes-Côte d'Azur